The 3rd Light Mechanized Division was a French Army division active during World War II.

World War 2

Battle Of France
During the Battle of France in May 1940 the division contained the following units:

5th Light Mechanized Armoured Brigade
1st Cuirassier Armoured Regiment
2nd Cuirassier Armoured Regiment
6th Light Mechanized Infantry Brigade
11th Dragoon Mechanized Infantry Regiment
12th Cuirassier Reconnaissance Cavalry Regiment
76th Mechanized Artillery Regiment

References

Light Mechanized Division, 3rd